Brigadier General Virgilio Norberto Cordero Jr. (June 6, 1893- June 9, 1980) was a Puerto Rican soldier who served in the United States Army. Cordero authored two books about his experiences as a prisoner of war, and his participation in the Bataan Death March of World War II.

Early years
Cordero was born in San Juan, the capital city of Puerto Rico when the island was still a Spanish colony. There he received his primary and secondary education. He moved to the United States and earned a bachelor's degree in engineering from Penn State University in 1917. That year he also graduated from the ROTC (Reserve Officers' Training Corps) program of that educational institution. He then entered the officers candidate school in Madison Barracks, New York and graduated with the rank of second lieutenant.

Military career
Cordero enlisted in the United States Army after graduating from PSU. He served in World War I and by 1922, according to the Official Army register, he held the rank of captain of infantry.

On December 8, 1941, when Japanese planes attacked the U.S. military installations in the Philippines, Cordero, who by then held the rank of colonel, was the Battalion Commander of the 31st Infantry Regiment. The 31st Infantry covered the withdrawal of American and Philippine forces to the Bataan Peninsula and fought for four months, despite the fact that no help could come in from the outside after much of the United States Pacific Fleet was destroyed at Pearl Harbor and mid-ocean bases at Guam and Wake Island were lost. 

Cordero was named Regimental Commander of the 52nd Infantry Regiment of the new Filipino Army, thus becoming the first Puerto Rican to command a Filipino Army regiment. The Bataan Defense Force surrendered on April 9, 1942, and Cordero and his men underwent torture and humiliation during the Bataan Death March and nearly four years of captivity. Cordero was one of nearly 1,600 members of the 31st Infantry who were taken as prisoners. Half of these men perished while prisoners of the Japanese forces. Cordero along with other senior US military officers were liberated in the Mukden POW Camp after the unconditional surrender of Japan in September 2, 1945. 

From July 1946 to November 1947, he served in the US military base in Caserta, Italy before returning to the United States. While in Italy, he was awarded a Silver Star Medal and the Legion of Merit for his actions in Bataan.

Silver Star citation

Post-World War II
Cordero continued to serve in the military retiring in 1953 after 36 years of service. Cordero wrote about his experiences as a prisoner of war and what he went through during the Bataan Death March. He authored My Experiences during the War with Japan, which was published in 1950. In 1957, he authored a revised Spanish version titled Bataan y la Marcha de la Muerte; Volume 7 of Colección Vida e Historia, published by: A. Aguado.

On June 9, 1980, Cordero died of lung ailment in the U.S. Navy Hospital in the Roosevelt Roads base in Ceiba, Puerto Rico. He was buried with full military honors in Section G, Plot 3 in the Puerto Rico National Cemetery located in the city of Bayamón, Puerto Rico. Cordero was survived by his wife, the former Gloria Haydon (1922-1981) of Needham, Massachusetts, four children and three grandchildren.

Military decorations
Among the military decorations which Cordero earned were the following:
 

Tabs:
   31st Infantry Regiment

Further reading
Puertorriquenos Who Served With Guts, Glory, and Honor. Fighting to Defend a Nation Not Completely Their Own; by : Greg Boudonck;

See also

 List of Puerto Ricans
 List of Puerto Rican military personnel
 Puerto Ricans in World War II
 Military history of Puerto Rico
 Hispanic Americans in World War II

References

1893 births
1980 deaths
United States Army personnel of World War I
United States Army personnel of World War II
United States Army personnel of the Korean War
Bataan Death March prisoners
People from San Juan, Puerto Rico
Puerto Rican military officers
Puerto Rican Army personnel
Penn State College of Engineering alumni
Recipients of the Silver Star
Recipients of the Legion of Merit
United States Army generals